Robbie Kondor is an American composer, session musician, and arranger. He has worked as a composer on The Significant Other, Ball In The House, Sally Jessy Raphael, Happiness (1998), The Suburbans (1999), Forever Fabulous (1999), Drawing Angel (2001), Series 7: The Contenders (2001), Home Delivery (2004) and Equality U (2008). He has worked as a producer for The Sum of All Fears (2002), and as an arranger on Beaches (1988), and the 32nd Annual Grammy Awards (1990).

He is credited as keyboard player and arranger on albums by Eric Clapton, Aretha Franklin, Barbra Streisand, Billy Joel, Whitney Houston, Bee Gees and several others.

He was the band leader and announcer for Hot Properties in 1985, and participated in the House Band on five Pavarotti and Friends specials from 1998 to 2002. He filled in for Paul Shaffer Late Show with David Letterman on two episodes, in 1994 and 2003, and played keyboards in the band on many other occasions.

In 2010 Kondor joined the Troubadour Reunion Tour supporting James Taylor and Carole King.

Personal life
Kondor is married to singer and musician Emily Bindiger; they live in North Salem, New York.

Awards and nominations
National Academy of Recording Arts and Sciences Most Valuable Player Award

Elevate Film Festival Best Original Score

Daytime Emmy Awards:

Won, 1999, Outstanding Music Direction and Composition for a Drama Series for: "All My Children" (shared with Paul F. Antonelli, A.J. Gundell, Pamela Magee, Dominic Messinger, Ron Goodman, Mike Renzi, Terry Walker, Gary Kuo)
Nominated, 2000, Outstanding Achievement in Music Direction and Composition for a Drama Series for: "All My Children" (shared with Terry Walker, A.J. Gundell, Jerry Pilato, Dominic Messinger, Mike Renzi, Gary Kuo, and Ron Goodman)
Nominated, 2001, Outstanding Achievement in Music Direction and Composition for a Drama Series for: "All My Children" (shared with Terry Walker, A.J. Gundell, Jerry Pilato, Dominic Messinger, Gary Kuo, Mike Renzi, John Wineglass, Brian Comotto, Loris Holland, and Ron Goodman)
Won, 2002, Outstanding Achievement in Music Direction and Composition for a Drama Series for: "All My Children" (shared with Terry Walker, A.J. Gundell, Jerry Pilato, Dominic Messinger, Gary Kuo, Mike Renzi, John Wineglass, Brian Comotto, Loris Holland, Ron Goodman, and Peter Fish)
Won, 2003, Outstanding Achievement in Music Direction and Composition for a Drama Series for: "All My Children" (shared with Terry Walker, Andrew J. Gundell, Jerry Pilato, Dominic Messinger, Gary Kuo, Mike Renzi, John Wineglass, Brian Comotto, Loris Holland, Ron Goodman, Brian Tarquin, Kim Oler, Peter Fish, and Jim Klein)

References

External links

Living people
American male composers
21st-century American composers
Emmy Award winners
Year of birth missing (living people)
21st-century American male musicians